Creative Commercials is an Indian film production company established by K. S. Rama Rao.

History
The company was started by K. S. Rama Rao in 1973 as a radio publicity company with the help of his friends Vadde Ramesh (producer), Rangachari (Lakshmi Films) and Chanti Babu (Vijaya Pictures).

Film production
Source:

Awards

References

Film production companies based in Hyderabad, India
1973 establishments in Andhra Pradesh
Indian companies established in 1973